James Jordan (born 21 June 1793 at Chatham, Kent; died 10 September 1866 at Chatham) was an English professional cricketer who played first-class cricket from 1822 to 1824.  He was mainly associated with Kent and made nine known appearances in first-class matches, including three for the Players.

References

1793 births
1866 deaths
English cricketers
English cricketers of 1787 to 1825
Kent cricketers
Players cricketers